Niels Rohweder (15 March 1906 – 21 April 1993) was a Danish architect. His work was part of the architecture event in the art competition at the 1932 Summer Olympics.

References

1906 births
1993 deaths
20th-century Danish architects
Olympic competitors in art competitions
People from Svendborg